Fritsen Valley is an upland valley to the north of the Mount Hercules summit area and west of Harris Ledge in the Olympus Range, McMurdo Dry Valleys, Antarctica. It was named by the Advisory Committee on Antarctic Names (2004) after Christian H. Fritsen, a microbiologist with the Division of Earth and Ecosystem Sciences, Desert Research Institute, Reno, Nevada, and a United States Antarctic Program investigator of pack ice and lake ice from about 1992.

References

Valleys of Victoria Land
McMurdo Dry Valleys